The 1980 Washington Diplomats season was the club's ninth season of existence, their ninth season in the North American Soccer League and their ninth season in the then-top tier of American soccer. The Dips played in the NASL's Eastern Division of the National Conference, and finished the season placed second in the division, behind the New York Cosmos.

The Dips qualified for the 1980 NASL Playoffs, but lost in the first round to the Los Angeles Aztecs in extra time of the second leg.

Background 

During the 1979 season, the Dips finished second the Eastern Conference of the National Division. They compiled a record of 19 wins and 11 defeats with 68 goals for and 50 scored against. Their record earned the Dips a berth into the 1979 NASL Playoffs, where they lost 2–0 in games to the Los Angeles Aztecs.

Squad 

The following players were contracted by the Washington Diplomats for part of the 1980 season.

Competitions

NASL

References 

1980
American soccer clubs 1980 season
1980 in sports in Washington, D.C.